Nida (Kursenieki: Nīde) is a resort town in Lithuania, the administrative centre of Neringa municipality. Located on the Curonian Spit between the Curonian Lagoon and the Baltic Sea, it is the westernmost point of Lithuania and the Baltic states, close to the border with the Russian Kaliningrad Oblast exclave. It currently has about 2,385 residents.

History 

A settlement area of the Baltic Curonians, the original place called nida ("fluent" in the Old Prussian language) was first mentioned in 1385 documents issued by the Teutonic Knights, who ruled the lands within their Monastic State. In 1454, King Casimir IV Jagiellon incorporated the region to the Kingdom of Poland upon the request of the anti-Teutonic Prussian Confederation. After the subsequent Thirteen Years' War (1454–1466), the fishing village became a part of Poland as a fief held by the Teutonic Knights until 1525, and by Ducal Prussia afterwards, and thus was located within the Polish–Lithuanian union and Commonwealth.

From 1701, it was part of the Kingdom of Prussia. In 1709 nearly all of the population died from a bubonic plague epidemic. Continuously threatened by sand drifts, the village was moved away from the approaching dune to today's position in the 1730s. Incorporated into the Prussian Province of East Prussia in 1773, it became part of the German Empire upon the German unification of 1871. In 1874 a lighthouse on Urbas hill was built, later destroyed in the war and rebuilt in 1945 and 1953. In 1878, the village had a population of 655, mostly living off fishing, with fish being sold mainly to nearby Klaipėda and other coastal towns. Nida already was the largest village of the Curonian Spit. Both Lithuanian and German-language church services were held there.

Artists' colony

From the late 19th century, the dune landscape became popular with landscape and animal painters from the Kunstakademie Königsberg arts school. The local inn of Herman Blode was the nucleus of the expressionist artists' colony (Künstlerkolonie Nidden). Lovis Corinth sojourned there, as did Max Pechstein, Alfred Lichtwark, Karl Schmidt-Rottluff, and Alfred Partikel. Painters from Königsberg such as Julius Freymuth and Eduard Bischoff visited the area, as did poets such as Ernst Wiechert and Carl Zuckmayer. Other guests included Ernst Kirchner, Ernst Mollenhauer, Franz Domscheit, and Herrmann Wirth. The painters usually took accommodations at Blode's hotel, and left some of their works with him. Some also built their own residences in the vicinity.

After World War I Nidden, together with the northern half of the Curonian Spit, became part of the Klaipėda Region under the 1919 Treaty of Versailles, but was subsequently incorporated to Lithuania in 1923. Renamed Nida, the village nevertheless remained a predominantly German settlement; the border with the remaining German (East Prussian) half of the spit lay only a few kilometers to the south.

In 1929 Nobel Prize-winning writer Thomas Mann visited Nida while on holiday in nearby Rauschen and decided to have a summer house erected on a hill above the lagoon; it was mocked by locals as Uncle Tom's Cabin. He and his family spent the summers of 1930–32 in the cottage, and parts of the epic novel Joseph and His Brothers were written there.

Threatened by the Nazis due to his political views, Mann left Germany after Hitler's Machtergreifung in 1933 and eventually emigrated to the United States. After the Klaipėda Region was again annexed by (now Nazified) Germany in 1939, his house was seized at the behest of Hermann Göring   and designated a recreation home for Luftwaffe officers.

Post-war
In 1939 the town had 736 inhabitants. Nida became nearly uninhabited, like all of the Curonian Spit, as a result of the Red Army advance and the Evacuation of East Prussia at the end of World War II, and the eventual expulsion of surviving German inhabitants. The town was reassigned to Lithuania under border changes promulgated at the Potsdam Conference, and became part of the Lithuanian SSR within the Soviet Union; since 1990 it has been part of independent Lithuania.

In the early postwar period, Nida was a little-visited fishing village. Later in Soviet times Nida, together with three other villages of the Neringa Municipality (Juodkrantė, Preila and Pervalka), was a controlled-entry holiday region reserved for the Communist party officialdom (nomenklatura) and senior industry elite. Strict planning regulations, a ban on industrial development and generous municipal subsidies kept it unspoiled. Since independence, the area has been open to all, but the number of visitors is kept relatively low by the small number of hotel rooms (new developments usually are permitted only on old buildings' foundations) and comparatively high rents.

Mann's summer cottage survived the war and was preserved on the initiative of the Lithuanian poet Antanas Venclova. A first memorial site was inaugurated already in 1967. In the Soviet era it hosted a library open in summer only, with residential quarters of the visiting librarian posted from Klaipėda upstairs and public areas downstairs. In 1995/96 the house was restored according to the original architectural design and reopenend as a cultural center dedicated to the writer, with a memorial exhibition and an annual festival.

Climate

Tourism

The town is an upmarket holiday resort, hosting about 200,000 to 300,000 tourists each summer, mostly Lithuanians, Germans, Latvians, and Russians. It is characterized by low-key entertainment and a distinct family focus. However, during recent years  it has become a decent point of interest for fine electronica music and modern art shows at an eclectic forest retreat.

Since 2001, a jazz festival has been held every year. A local radio station Neringa FM streams live beats over FM and online. There are also interesting places to see nearby, including some of the highest sand dunes in Europe, a large sundial (which has been restored after being damaged by a Baltic gale), Fisherman's Ethnographic Homestead, gallery-museum of amber and a German Protestant (Evangelische) Brick Gothic church (built in 1888). There is also a campsite.

The town is known for Nidden Kurenwimpel — German for "Curonian pennants" — ornate carved flags particular to local families resident on the Curonian Spit. The flags, replicas of which can be seen around Nida, feature animal and human figures as pictograms reminiscent of a pagan writing tradition. At the local cemetery, examples of krikštas (pl. krikštai), pagan burial markers in place of tombstones, can still be seen.

Nida's beach participates in the Blue Flag Programme. Nudists make use of parts of the beach near Nida for nude bathing.

Transportation
Nida Airport is located in the town, but it has no scheduled routes and only capable of handling small aircraft. Nida also has a seaport which is used for ferries and fishing boats.

The only road which runs along the whole length of the Curonian Spit, connecting Zelenogradsk and Smiltynė (where a ferry connection to Klaipėda exists), passes through the edge of Nida. An hourly bus runs between Nida and Smiltynė ferry terminal on that road, and intercity buses to various cities like Kaliningrad, Klaipėda, Kaunas and Vilnius exist.

Notable people from Nida
 Reinhard Henkys (1928–2005), German journalist
 Tadas Sedekerskis (born 1998), Lithuanian basketball player
 Justė Zinkevičiūtė (born 1989), Lithuanian actor, writer, lifestyle teacher
 Vanda Nida (born 1922), Polish Poet and an Artist, Servant of Divine Mercy (1980-), Anti-Abortionist

Gallery

Notes

References

External links

 
Seaside resorts in Lithuania
Artist colonies
Neringa Municipality
Municipalities administrative centres of Lithuania
Nude beaches